Solvita Āboltiņa ( Mellupe; born 19 February 1963) is a Latvian politician who was Speaker of the Saeima from 2010 until 2014.

Early life
She graduated from Riga Secondary School No. 5, a German language immersion school in 1981, and from the Faculty of Law at the Latvian State University in 1986.

Political career 

She is the leader of Unity, Latvia's largest centre-right party and partner in the current coalition government. Despite being the leader of the largest governing party, she has never been the Prime Minister of Latvia. She has been a deputy of the Saeima since November 7, 2006. In November 2014 after a parliamentary election she was replaced as the speaker and appointed chairwoman of the National Security Committee of the Saeima. She caused controversy after being 'struck off' the Unity list of candidates by electors at the 2014 election. Such an outcome is possible for any candidate under Latvia's method of proportional representation. As a result, she was not returned as a member of the Saeima and elected Unity member Jānis Junkurs forfeited his mandate to allow the party President to continue to sit in parliament.

Honours

Foreign Honours 
 : Recipient First Class of the Order of the Cross of Terra Mariana (05.06.2012, serie 1003 - decision n° 99)

References

External links

Speaker Solvita Āboltiņa

|-

1963 births
Living people
Politicians from Riga
New Era Party politicians
New Unity politicians
21st-century Latvian women politicians
Ministers of Justice of Latvia
Speakers of the Saeima
Deputies of the 8th Saeima
Deputies of the 9th Saeima
Deputies of the 10th Saeima
Deputies of the 11th Saeima
Women deputies of the Saeima
21st-century Latvian politicians
Women government ministers of Latvia
Female justice ministers
University of Latvia alumni
Recipients of the Order of the Cross of Terra Mariana, 1st Class